Cyril Chung (16 July 1932 – 28 August 2022), better known as Sammy Chung, was an English football player and manager, one of the first Anglo-Chinese players in English football.

Playing career
Chung was born in Abingdon-on-Thames to a Chinese father and English mother. He began his career with local side Abingdon Town and then Southern League side Headington United. He joined Reading of the Third Division South in 1953 but did not sign professional forms until he had completed his national service. He made a good start to his professional career, scoring four goals in five appearances at the end of 1953–54. After scoring eight in the first 17 games of 1954–55, he moved to Norwich City on 1 January 1955. He played 16 times in 1955–56, and 11 times in 1956–57 as the Canaries finished bottom of the Third Division South. Chung moved to Watford for the 1957–58 season, where under Neil McBain the side were relegated to the Fourth Division. The Hornets secured a return to the Third Division with promotion in 1959–60 and narrowly missed out on promotion to the second tier in 1960–61 and 1963–64. Chung played a total of 242 times for Watford, scoring 24 goals.

Managerial career
Chung gained his first coaching experience while still a player at Watford, under manager Bill McGarry. When McGarry left to become manager of Ipswich Town, he took Chung with him as assistant. At Ipswich they won promotion to the First Division as champions in 1968.

Following a short period as manager of Swedish side IFK Västerås, he returned to join Bill McGarry, now at Wolverhampton Wanderers, as his assistant. As part of the management team, they guided Wolves to victory in the 1974 League Cup. The club were relegated in 1976 and McGarry departed, leaving Chung to be appointed manager.

He won promotion back to the top flight as Second Division champions in his first season. He led the club to a 15th-place finish in 1977–78, but the following season began with a run of 11 defeats in 14, leading to his dismissal following protests from the club's fans.

After a period coaching in the United Arab Emirates, he returned to England in 1985 as assistant manager to Mick Mills at Stoke City where he spent five years and was later in the backroom staff at Blackburn Rovers in 1991–92. He had a spell as manager of non-league side Tamworth between January 1992 and January 1993, before being appointed manager of Doncaster Rovers in July 1994, a post he held until August 1996. His Doncaster spell brought two promising seasons on the field, but promotion challenges gradually petered out into mid-table finishes.

In 1999, he was appointed director of football in Barbados.

In 2005, he joined the coaching staff at Minehead.

Personal life and death
After retiring from football, Chung worked in a children's home. He later lived on the Somerset coast.

Chung died in a nursing home on 28 August 2022, at the age of 90.

Career statistics

Managerial statistics

References

External links
 
 Sammy Chung Oxford United stats at RageOnline.co.uk

1932 births
2022 deaths
English people of Chinese descent
English footballers
English Football League players
British sportspeople of Chinese descent
British Asian footballers
Abingdon Town F.C. players
Oxford United F.C. players
Reading F.C. players
Norwich City F.C. players
Watford F.C. players
English football managers
Wolverhampton Wanderers F.C. managers
Tamworth F.C. managers
Doncaster Rovers F.C. managers
Blackburn Rovers F.C. non-playing staff
Watford F.C. non-playing staff
Stoke City F.C. non-playing staff
English Football League managers
Association football forwards
People from Abingdon-on-Thames
Association football coaches